This is a list of the 24 members of the European Parliament for Hungary in the 2004 to 2009 session.

List

Party representation

See also
 Members of the European Parliament 2004–09 – List by country
 List of members of the European Parliament, 2004–09 – Full alphabetical list
 2004 European Parliament election in Hungary
 2004 European Parliament election
 Parliamentary Groups

Notes

Hungary
2004
List